Quickia is a genus of gastropods belonging to the family Succineidae.

The species of this genus are found in Africa and India.

Species:

Quickia aldabraensis 
Quickia aldabrensis 
Quickia bensoni 
Quickia calcuttensis 
Quickia concisa 
Quickia gravelyi

References

Gastropods